Kevin Anthony Thomas (13 August 1944 – 9 October 2022) was an English footballer who played as a goalkeeper in the Football League for Blackpool, Tranmere Rovers, Oxford United and Southport. Thomas died from a stroke on 9 October 2022 at Trinity Hospice, Blackpool, at the age of 78.

References

1944 births
2022 deaths
Sportspeople from Prescot
English footballers
Association football goalkeepers
English Football League players
Prescot Cables F.C. players
Blackpool F.C. players
Tranmere Rovers F.C. players
Oxford United F.C. players
Southport F.C. players
Barrow A.F.C. players